The Electoral district of Belfast and Warrnambool was one of the original sixteen electoral districts of the unicameral Legislative Council of the British colony of Victoria in 1851 to 1856.

The district included the towns of Belfast (renamed to Port Fairy around 1889) and Warrnambool.  It was abolished when the single house was replaced in 1856 by a bicameral system consisting of the Victorian Legislative Assembly (lower house) and Victorian Legislative Council (upper house, consisting of Provinces).

Members

One member initially, two from the expansion of the Council in 1853.

See also
 Parliaments of the Australian states and territories
 List of members of the Victorian Legislative Council

Notes
 = resigned
 = by-election

Beaver went on to represent the Electoral district of Belfast in the Victorian Legislative Assembly from November 1856.

Horne went on to represent the Electoral district of Warrnambool in the Victorian Legislative Assembly from November 1856.

References

Former electoral districts of Victorian Legislative Council
1851 establishments in Australia
1856 disestablishments in Australia